Little Baldon is a hamlet in the Marsh Baldon civil parish, about  southeast of Oxford in Oxfordshire, south of Marsh Baldon and west of Chiselhampton.

Little Baldon is near the other "Baldon" villages included in an old rhyme:

Marsh Baldon, Toot Baldon, Baldon on the Green,
Little Baldon, Big Baldon, Baldon-in-between

It is where an RAF Handley Page Hastings crashed in 1965, killing all 41 people aboard. This was the third worst air crash in the United Kingdom up to that time. A memorial plaque in the parish church of St Lawrence at Toot Baldon commemorates the disaster.

See also
 Baldon Row
 List of places in Oxfordshire

References

Hamlets in Oxfordshire
South Oxfordshire District